Toni Milaqi (born 1974, Tirana, Albania ) is a contemporary artist (painter, draughtsman).

Studies

1992

National Academy of Fine Arts, Tirana, Albania/ Monumental Painting Section.

1988

Artistic High School "Jordan Misja", Tirana, Albania/ graduate in Painting, Drawing & Graphics.

Solo exhibitions

2016

 "De la violence et autres démons", Galerie Desmos, curated by Eva Tzimourta, Paris, France.

2016

 "The Sleep of Reason Produces Monsters", Balkan Art Gallery, curated by Alex Lazaridis,  Xanthi, Greece.

1999

 Astrolavos Gallery, Piraeus, Greece

1996

 Dimokritos Gallery, Athens, Greece

Group exhibitions

2021

 "#Not Alone",  ART HUB Athens / The Project Gallery, Athens, Greece.

2014

 "Dia- Project",  curated by Elina & Dora Theodoropoulou, Byzantine and Christian Museum, Athens, Greece.

2013

 "The Art Reportages in Athens",  curated by Christos Alaveras, Retirement Home, Saranda, Albania.

2012

 ART Ist -"Terrain insecure", Multifunctional Cultural Center, Përmet, Albania. Curated by Elsa Martini.

2010

 "CheapArt -Thessaloniki 2010", Kodra former Army Camp, curated by George and Dimitris Georgakopoulos, Thessaloniki, Greece.

2009

 "CheapArt -Thessaloniki", Kodra former Army Camp, curated by George Georgakopoulos and Dimitris Georgakopoulos, Afrodite Oikonomidou and Delia Gianti, Thessaloniki, Greece.

2008

 "CheapArt 14", CheapArt Gallery, curated by George Georgakopoulos and Dimitris Georgakopoulos, Athens, Greece

2007

 "Pa(varesia)", National Gallery of Arts, curated by Elsa Martini, Tirana, Albania

2004

 "Colours of Albania", National Gallery of Arts, curated by Edi Muka, Tirana, Albania

1999

 Astrolavos Gallery, Athens, Greece

1999

 "Minus-Plus", Hellenic American Union, curated by Manos Stefanidis and Nadja Argyropoulou, Athens, Greece

1997

  Arieta Gallery (Plaka), Athens, Greece

1996

 Dimokritos Gallery, Athens, Greece

Residencies
2008

 Artist in Residence, International Open Art Residency 2008, curated and organised by Charalambos Dermatis and George Georgakopoulos, Eretria, Greece.

2012

 ART Ist -"Terrain insecure", Përmet, Albania. Curated by Elsa Martini.

Toni Milaqi currently lives and works in Athens, Greece.

External links
Toni Milaqi's Official website
TONI MILAQI (paintings)
TONI MILAQI (drawings)

Paintings

1974 births
Living people
Artists from Tirana
Artists from Athens
Albanian painters
Greek painters